The women's field hockey tournament at the 1984 Summer Olympics was the 2nd edition of the field hockey event for women at the Summer Olympic Games. It was held from July 31 – August 10, 1984.

Six teams competed in a single round-robin tournament. The Netherlands won the tournament, finishing top of the pool at the culmination of the tournament, West Germany won the silver medal finishing second. The United States and Australia played out a penalty shoot-out for the bronze medal after finishing equal on points and goal difference in the round robin stage, which the United States won 10–5.

Participating nations

Squads

Results

Standings

Fixtures

Play–off

Final standings

Goalscorers

References

External links

1984
Women's tournament
1984 in women's field hockey
1984 Summer Olympics - Women's tournament
Field